Elizabeth 'Liz' Olin (born December 21, 1990) is an American actress. Her most notable film to date is God of Love, written, directed, and starring NYU Graduate student Luke Matheny, which won the Academy Award for Best Live Action Short Film in 2011. She has also appeared in When in Rome, a Touchstone Pictures film directed by Mark Steven Johnson. Olin filmed Killing Season alongside Robert De Niro, John Travolta, and Milo Ventimiglia, which was released in summer 2013.

Filmography

References

External links

 http://www.elizabetholin.com

Actresses from Louisville, Kentucky
American film actresses
Living people
21st-century American actresses
1990 births